William Dorsey Swann (March 1860 – c. December 23, 1925) was an American LGBT activist in a time where leadership in the movement was uncommon. An African-American born into slavery, Swann was the first person in the United States to lead a queer resistance group and the first known person to self-identify as a "queen of drag".

Early life 
Swann was born in March 1860 into slavery. He was the fifth oldest child in a Protestant family with 13 children. He was enslaved in Hancock, Maryland. After the Civil War, his parents were able to buy a farm. Swann's first job was working as a hotel waiter. When Swann was 24 years old, he was caught stealing from books from the Washington Library Company and an item from the home of his employers. Swann pled guilty to petty larceny and was sentenced to six months in jail. 

Swann’s former employers, the sentencing judge and the Assistant US Attorney filed a presidential pardon for Swann on the grounds that Swann was "free from vice, industrious, refined in his habits, and associations, gentle in his disposition, courteous in his bearing". The petitioners emphasized that "he was trying to improve his education and provide for his family, and that his former employers would happily offer lifetime employment as the college janitor".

Activism 
During the 1880s and 1890s, Swann organized a series of drag balls in Washington, D.C. He called himself the "queen of drag". Most of the attendees of Swann's gatherings were men who were formerly enslaved who gathered to dance in their satin and silk dresses. This group, consisting of "former slaves and rebel drag queens", was known as the "House of Swann". Because these events were secretive, invitations were often quietly made at places like the YMCA.

Swann participated in dances such as the cakewalk, a dance performed by enslaved people in America, mimicking the mannerisms of plantation owners. The cakewalk’s improvisational movements and subtle expressions of communication resemble voguing, the style popularized in Harlem’s ball scene.

Swann was arrested in police raids numerous times, including in the first documented case of an arrest for female impersonation in the United States, on April 12, 1888. This event was Swann's thirtieth birthday celebration. According to The Washington Post, he was "arrayed in a gorgeous dress of cream-colored satin". After the birthday celebration was raided by police, Swann was "bursting with rage", as he stood up to one of the arresting officers and declared "you is no gentleman". 

Swann's choice to resist that night "rather than to submit passively to his arrest marks one of the earliest-known instances of violent resistance in the name of gay rights". Twelve other African-American men were arrested at the raid and as many as seventeen others escaped that night. The arrests made at Swann's parties were published in the local newspapers, so townsfolk risked their reputation by attending. However, "acts of public shaming like this one are the only reason we now know who Swann was. The identities and stories of the men who escaped capture have been lost to history." 

This public shaming made it more difficult for Swann to throw parties in secret. In 1896, he was convicted of "keeping a disorderly house", a euphemism for running a brothel, and was sentenced to 10 months in jail. After his sentencing, he requested a pardon from President Grover Cleveland. This request was denied, but Swann was the first American on record who pursued legal and political action to defend the LGBTQ community's right to gather.

Relationships 
Swann was known to have been close with Pierce Lafayette and Felix Hall, two men who had also both been enslaved and who formed the earliest documented male same-sex relationship between enslaved Americans. Pierce Lafayette also attended Swann's balls. Swann and Lafayette were known to be intimate.

Later life 
When Swann stopped organizing and participating in drag events, his brother, Danial J. Swann, continued to make costumes for and take part in the drag community for almost 50 years. Two of his brothers had been active participants in Swann's drag balls.

Death 
Swann died c. December 23, 1925 at the age of 65 in Hancock, Maryland. He was cremated. After his death, local officials burned his home.

Legacy 
Swann is the subject of the non-fiction book The House of Swann: Where Slaves Became Queens by Channing Joseph. It is set for publication by Picador.  

There are no pictures of Swann to date. 

Swann is known as the first drag queen. As a black, gay man, Swann paved the way for future drag queens and gay men of color. His legal efforts sparked conversation about the LGBTQ+ community and may have even been one of the first instances of LGBTQ+ activism in the United States. At the time of his activism, there was not much support and the ideas were not widespread. He helped lay the foundation for future activists such as Marsha P. Johnson and others who fought during the "modern LGBTQ rights movements".

In 2022, the Dupont Circle Advisory Neighborhood Commission approved a resolution declaring that Swann Street, a road stretching for five blocks in Northwest Washington DC, is named after William Dorsey Swann. Until that resolution, it had been assumed that the street's original namesake was the 19th-century politician and slave owner Thomas Swann.

See also 
 Ball culture
 LGBT social movements
 African-American LGBT community
 Drag queen
 Cross-dressing

References

Further reading

External links 
 Photographs of postcards from the James Gardniner collection, illustrating female impersonators from Swann's time
 

1850s births
African-American drag queens
LGBT African Americans
American LGBT rights activists
LGBT people from Maryland
People from Hancock, Maryland
19th-century American LGBT people
American freedmen
Year of death missing
Date of birth missing
LGBT people from Washington, D.C.